Palme may refer to:

Places
 Palme (Barcelos), a parish in the municipality of Barcelos, Portugal
 La Palme, Aude, a commune in southern France
 Palmanova, in Italy, known as Palme in the local Friulian language

People
 Palme (surname)
 Sieur de la Palme, (Lord of Palme), a lord of French North America for Plaisance in what is now Newfoundland
 Olof Palme (1927–1986), the assassinated former Prime Minister of Sweden

Entertainment
 Palme (film), a 2012 Swedish documentary film
 Tree of Palme, a 2002 anime film

Other uses
 Palme, a Finnish ship which sank off Dún Laoghaire on Christmas Eve 1895, resulting in the Kingstown Lifeboat Disaster

See also
 Palme d'Or
 Praslin, in Seychelles, formerly known as Île De Palme
 Palmen
 Palm (disambiguation)